The Al Dissi mosque or the Al Disi mosque is an ancient mosque located within the walls of the Old City of Jerusalem, on the edge between the Armenian Quarter and the Jewish Quarter.

In 2018 the King of Morocco, Mohammed VI, funded the renovation of the mosque; Israeli newspaper Yedioth Ahronoth states that the local Jewish community and the Waqf "came to an agreement" that there would be no muezzin calling from the minaret. Sheikh Mazen Ahram, a Jerusalem Imam, says that the mosque's muezzin loudspeakers were confiscated by Israeli authorities in 1993, who subsequently prevented any announcements from the minaret. He also says that the land in front of the mosque, owned by the Islamic Waqf,  was confiscated by Israel and converted into a car park, and that due to its location near the Jewish Quarter, users of the mosque have faced racist insults and harassment.

History

The mosque dates back to the Ayyubid era of Al-Mu'azzam Isa, and was later restored in the Mamluk era. In 1487 it was endowed by Al-Kameli ibn Abu-Sharif, and mention the mosque as "Masjid al-Omar". It was subsequently named the Al Dissi Mosque after a member of the Jerusalemite Al Dissi family.

1967-76 demolition works carried out by the “Jewish Quarter Development Company” adjacent to the site damaged the structure of the mosque; it was subsequently renovated by the Islamic Waqf.

Description
The mosque has a minaret that is about 15 meters high, and has an area of 60 square meters. The mosque prayer area is situated along a small corridor behind the low steel gate in the main entrance.

References 

Mosques in Jerusalem
Ayyubid architecture in the State of Palestine
Mamluk architecture